The SEAT Exeo is a large family car and flagship model, that was built by the Spanish car manufacturer SEAT, subsidiary of the Volkswagen Group.

Previously codenamed Bolero, (though not to be confused with SEAT's earlier concept car bearing the same name) and internally designated Typ 3R, the name Exeo derives from the Latin word exire, meaning "to go beyond", breaking SEAT's recent tradition to name its cars after Spanish cities.

This car was made available in four door saloon or five door estate styles only. Production of the Exeo ended in May 2013, with the final production number being 81,552. It was replaced by SEAT Toledo for the saloon, and the SEAT León ST for the estate.

Overview
The Exeo is a D-segment model, which is built on the Volkswagen Group B7 (PL46) platform. It is essentially a rebadged Audi A4 B7 generation, with styling changes to the front and rear by way of unique bonnet, front wings, boot lid, doors and exterior door mirrors.

It incorporates interior trim from the A4 Cabriolet, and extensively uses A4 B6 and B7 interior equipment and electrical components. To this purpose, the entire Audi A4 B7 production and assembly lines from Ingolstadt were dismantled and installed in Volkswagen Group's related SEAT factory in Martorell, Spain.

The Exeo was officially revealed at the 2008 Paris Motor Show, and at launch, it was confirmed to be available in just one car body style, as a four-door, five-seater saloon (Typ 3R5). However, from August 2009, it also became available as a five-door, five-seater estate, called Exeo ST (Typ 3R9). ST is an abbreviation for Sport Tourer.

It became available for purchase in Western Europe in March 2009, with a model lineup which initially included three petrol engines and two diesel engines, with a third lower-powered  diesel engine being added from September 2009.

In May 2010, three new petrol engines entered production, these were the 1.8 TFSI , the 1.8 TFSI  and the 2.0 TFSI . It was available with three different trim levels: Reference, Stylance and Sport.

In 2011, the Exeo got a minor facelift with new bi-xenon LED headlights, revised engines and a new honeycomb grille.

Awards
Golden Steering Wheel Award 2009 in Switzerland, in the upper medium sedan category
Company Car 2009 in Germany, for the SEAT Exeo ST
Car of the Year 2010 in Finland, by the Finnish magazine Tuulilasi
Novelty of the Year 2009 in Catalonia

Powertrain
The Exeo being derived from the Audi B7 A4, it shares the same fundamental powertrain layout. It has engines mounted at the front, and they are oriented longitudinally, i.e.: "north south", rather than the "east west" transverse engine layout used in the remainder of the SEAT range. The gearboxes are of a transaxle type (containing the gearbox, along with the front final drive and differential), and are also mounted longitudinally at the rear of the engine.

For the 1.8-litre 20 valve Turbo petrol engine, one side-mounted intercooler (SMIC) is fitted to the lower front left of the car, below the left headlamp. For the 2.0 TSI petrol, along with the   diesel engines, these use two SMICs, one below the left and right headlamps.

All diesel engine variants are common rail (CR) Turbocharged Direct Injection (TDI) engines and includes an exhaust catalytic converter along with a diesel particulate filter (DPF).

Transmission options initially included only a six-speed manual gearbox. Shortly after launch, the LuK originated multitronic continuously variable transmission (CVT), with selectable six or seven speeds, became available on models equipped with the 2.0 TSI petrol and 2.0 TDI diesel engines. Distribution of the engine torque to the driven roadwheels is only via the front wheels, and there is not a four-wheel-drive offering, which the Audi A4 used as an option in its 'trademark' quattro.

Engine specifications
All available internal combustion engines are inline four cylinder four stroke designs and are based on existing units capable to be fitted longitudinally in the Exeo's PL46 platform and have also been used in other marques of the Volkswagen Group. They all comply with the European Euro 5 emissions standard, and offer the following performance statistics (for the saloon version in standard configuration):

Other features
The Exeo also features the same multi link fully independent front and rear suspension as used on the Audi A4, again with light weight cast aluminium alloy front suspension arms and virtual steering axis uprights. All models are equipped with ZF-supplied power steering, with some models having speed sensitive 'servotronic' variable assistance.

All discs, front and rear, use a single piston sliding brake caliper.

Chassis electronics feature as standard the Bosch ESP 8.0 Electronic Stability Programme, which also includes Anti lock Braking System (ABS), Electronic Brakeforce Distribution (EBD), and emergency Brake Assist (BA). This ESP system also includes Anti Slip Regulation (ASR, or traction control), and Electronic Differential Lock (EDL) traction aids.

Roadwheel options vary from a basic 7Jx16 steel wheel with plastic wheel covers, to a number of variants of alloy wheels, from 16" to 18" in diameter. Conventional halogen dual bulb (H7 dip and H1 main) headlamps are standard, with self leveling single source Bi Xenon high-intensity discharge (HID) headlights available as an option.

Sales 
In the year of 2009, the total annual retail sales number of SEAT Exeo cars was 21,013 vehicles (12,837 units for the Exeo and 8,176 for the Exeo ST version), while the annual production came up to 22,981 cars made in SEAT's plant in Martorell.

The total production per year of SEAT Exeo and Exeo ST cars is shown below:

See also
Audi A4

References

External links

SEAT Exeo LAST EDITION – SEAT ES website

Cars introduced in 2008
2010s cars
Mid-size cars
Sedans
Station wagons
Front-wheel-drive vehicles
Vehicles with CVT transmission
Flagship vehicles
Euro NCAP large family cars
Exeo
Cars of Spain